pstree is a Linux command that shows the running processes as a tree. It is used as a more visual alternative to the ps command. The root of the tree is either init or the process with the given pid.  It can also be installed in other Unix systems.

In BSD systems, a similar output is created using ps -d, in Linux ps axjf produces similar output.

Examples

pstree pid
user@host ~$ pstree 1066
rsyslogd─┬─{in:imjournal}
         └─{rs:main Q:Reg}

pstree username
user@host ~# pstree username
dbus-daemon───{dbus-daemon}

dbus-launch

bash───firefox─┬─6*[{Analysis Helper}]
               ├─{BgHangManager}
               ├─{Cache2 I/O}
               ├─{Compositor}
               ├─{GMPThread}
               ├─{Gecko_IOThread}
               ├─{Hang Monitor}
               ├─{ImageBridgeChil}
               ├─{ImageIO}
               ├─{JS Watchdog}
               ├─{Link Monitor}
               ├─{Socket Thread}
               ├─{SoftwareVsyncTh}
               ├─{StreamTrans #1}
               ├─{Timer}
               └─{gmain}

See also
top
ps
kill
nice
tree

References

External links
 The psmisc package
 The pstree Command by The Linux Information Project (LINFO) 
 Gnome Process Tree
 The portable version of pstree on GitHub
 
 

Unix process- and task-management-related software